KLBT is a radio station airing a Contemporary Christian Music format, licensed to Beaumont, Texas, broadcasting on 88.1 MHz FM. The station serves the Beaumont – Port Arthur metropolitan area, and is owned by The King's Musician Educational Foundation, Inc.

References

External links
KLBT's official website

LBT